Kiara Laetitia (real name Chiara Letizia Pernigotti - Tortona June 16, 1979)  is an Italian-born rock singer and entrepreneur. She now lives in London.

Career
She is known for being the vocalist in Skylark from 2003 to 2011 and her solo EP Fight Now with David DeFeis from Virgin Steele. Fight Now reached #15 in the Italian Amazon Music Chart in 2013.

In Japan she is featured in a collection of trading cards together with Ronnie James Dio, Kai Hansen, Marilyn Manson, Kiss, and Metallica. The album The Last Gate reached #3 in the HMV Japan Charts in 2007.

In 2014 she launched Musicarchy Media, a rock and metal record label and management company whose artists include Deadly Circus Fire, Haster.

On September 11, 2017 Kiara Laetitia published her first book Extreme Makeover Music, a management method for independent artists and announced a comeback as a vocalist.

In October 2017, the album The Last Gate reached the iTunes Top 200 Australian Metal Charts at #28, ten years after its release.

In June 2018 Laetitia releases 7th album Bulletproof, this time with Rockstar Frame.

In December 2019 she releases her follow up book ‘’Never Give Up The Real Secrets Of The Music Industry’’ and a calendar to support mental health awareness. 

On May 16 2020 Kiara Laetitia creates Online Female Fest the first virtual all female festival with performances of Lacey Sturm and Share Ross from Vixen among others, which obtained great success worldwide.

Discography

With Skylark
Wings (2004)
In The Heart Of The Princess (2005)
Fairytales (2005)
Divine Gates Part III: The Last Gate (2007)

Live
Divine Gates Part IV: The Live Gate (2009)

Solo
 Fight Now (2013, Musicarchy Media)

 ‘’The Power Of Love ‘’ feat. Sonny Ensabella (2019)

With Rockstar Frame
 Christmas Rape (Single. Dec 15 2017, Musicarchy Media)
 Bulletproof (Lead and backing vocals. June 15, 2018, Musicarchy Media)

Guest work

Books
 Extreme Makeover Music - Management Method For Indie Artists

 Never Give Up - The Real Secrets Of The Music Industry

Fun Facts
As stated by Alissa White-Gluz in an interview for Bravewords in 2014, Kiara Laetitia was the one who brought her to the ER when she broke her ribs helping her with the medics

References

Italian musicians
Living people
Year of birth missing (living people)